The 1990 Dubai Duty Free Classic was a professional ranking snooker tournament that took place in November 1990 at the Al Nasr Stadium in Dubai, United Arab Emirates.

Defending champion Stephen Hendry won the tournament, defeating Steve Davis 9–1 in the final.


Main draw

References

Dubai Classic
Dubai Classic
Dubai Classic
Dubai Classic